Central Catholic High School may refer to:

Central Catholic High School (Pittsburgh, Pennsylvania)
Central Catholic High School (Modesto, California)
Central Catholic High School (Bloomington, Illinois)
Central Catholic High School (Morgan City, Louisiana)
Central Catholic High School (Lawrence, Massachusetts)
Central Catholic High School (Grand Island, Nebraska)
Central Catholic High School (West Point, Nebraska)
Central Catholic High School (Perry Township, Ohio)
Central Catholic High School (Toledo, Ohio)
Central Catholic High School (Portland, Oregon)
Central Catholic High School (DuBois, Pennsylvania)

Other schools

Allentown Central Catholic High School, in Allentown, Pennsylvania
Billings Central Catholic High School, in Billings, Montana
Central Catholic Marianist High School, in San Antonio, Texas
Cleveland Central Catholic High School in Cleveland, Ohio
Detroit Catholic Central High School, in Novi, Michigan
Greensburg Central Catholic High School, in Greensburg, Pennsylvania
Lafayette Central Catholic Jr/Sr High School, in Lafayette, Indiana
Newport Central Catholic High School, in Newport, Kentucky
Reading Central Catholic High School, in Reading, Pennsylvania (merged with Holy Name High School)
Tuscarawas Central Catholic High School, in New Philadelphia, Ohio
Wheeling Central Catholic High School, in Wheeling, West Virginia

See also
 
 Catholic Central High School (disambiguation)
 Central High School (disambiguation)